Wang He Di (born 20 December 1998), also known as Dylan Wang, is a Chinese actor. He is best known for his first leading role as Daoming Si in the 2018 television series Meteor Garden, which propelled him to fame internationally.

Early life and education
Dylan was born on 20 December 1998 in Leshan, Sichuan, Province of China. He was a 16th-level flight attendant and poster model for admission at Sichuan Southwest College of Civil Aviation, and also became a professional image spokesperson for flight attendants, before debuting in the show business. Even though Dylan never seemed to like the idea of flying, he's pursued it for most of his early life.

Life and career

2016–2017: Beginnings
In 2016, Dylan won the overall championship at the "Sichuan Campus Red Festival" (四川校园红人盛典), a ceremony sponsored by several universities and colleges, and officially entered the entertainment industry.

In June 2017, Dylan participated in the Youku variety show Super Idol hosted by He Jiong, and emerged as the final winner.

2018–present: Rising popularity
Dylan rose to fame with his first lead role as Daoming Si in the 2018 television series Meteor Garden, the remake of popular Taiwanese drama series Meteor Garden and based on the Japanese shōjo manga series  written by Yoko Kamio. Dylan appeared in Harper's Bazaar China with his Meteor Garden co-stars Darren Chen, Caesar Wu and Connor Leong in the November issue.

In 2018, it was announced that Dylan is one of the guests in a variety show with a music performance called Phanta City with his Meteor Garden costars. In October, he would join the second season of Hunan TV's variety show 
The Inn 2 with his Meteor Garden costar Shen Yue.

In January 2019, it was announced that Dylan has been cast as the male lead of the second season of fantasy drama Ever Night. The series premiered in January 2020. In June 2019, it was announced that Dylan has been cast in the youth revolutionary drama The National Southwest Associated University And Us.

In 2021, he starred as the male lead in the romantic office drama The Rational Life alongside Qin Lan, where he plays Qi Xiao, a young assistant, and the historical fantasy romance drama Miss The Dragon with Zhu Xudan, where he plays Yuchi Longyan, the Dragon King. At the same year, it was announced that he is cast as the male lead in the historical romance drama, Unchained Love, where he plays a eunuch, and in the modern comedy-drama  Never Give Up, starring alongside Chen Yuqi in both the dramas.

In March 2021, like the majority of Chinese celebrities, he publicly expressed his support for cotton from Xinjiang via social media after several companies announced they have stopped purchasing cotton from the region due to concerns that Uyghurs are forced to produce it.

In January 2022, Hunan Satellite TV's new variety show Hello, Saturday was officially broadcast, led by He Jiong, Feng Xi, Cai Shaofen, Qin Xiaoxian, Bridget, Dylan Wang, Tan Jianci, Cai Wenjing, Zhao Xiaotang and other resident guests co-hosted , the host group in the program called itself "Good 6 Group".

In July 2022, Dylan appeared on the urban exploration reality show Going All Out Action School. Dylan formed a group with partners Huang Minghao, Qin Xiaoxian and Hanikezi, exploring major cities. 

In August 2022, Dylan, with actress Yu Shuxin, starred in the iQiyi costume fairy drama Love Between Fairy and Devil, playing the role of "Dongfang Qingcang" in the play.  With over millions of followers on the Chinese social media Weibo, Dylan acting skills were well received. The show's popularity exceeded 10,000 on iQiyi's station 14 days after its launch, becoming the fourth iQIYI drama with a 10,000-point hit on the station.

Other activities
In November 2018, Dylan appeared as the youth ambassador at Le Tour De France Skoda Shanghai Criterium at China Arts Museum south square.

In September 2019, Dylan participated in the Super Penguin Basketball Celebrity Game hosted at the Shanghai Oriental Sports Center. Dylan was part of the red team who won the game at 56–45 points.

Filmography

Television series

Variety shows

Discography

Awards and nominations

References

External links
 
Dylan Wang on Instagram

Chinese male television actors
21st-century Chinese male actors
1998 births
Living people
Male actors from Chengdu
Singers from Sichuan
Chinese Mandopop singers
Chinese male models
Chinese television presenters
Chinese broadcasters
VJs (media personalities)